Magnor is a village in Eidskog Municipality in Innlandet county, Norway. The village lies along the Norwegian National Road 2 and the Kongsvingerbanen railway line.

The village is known as a production site for glass, made at Magnor Glassverk (lit. Magnor Glass Works) and also for the production of aluminium, made at Hydro Extrusion Norway.

During the border wars in the middle of the 17th century, there were fortifications in the area. In 1914, the famous Peace Monument was built in Magnor. It was designed by the Swedish architect Lars Johan Lehming and funded by the Swedish Peace and Arbitration Society to celebrate the peaceful dissolution of the union between Sweden and Norway in 1905.

References

Eidskog
Villages in Innlandet